Patrick Simmons (born 1948) is an American guitarist and singer.

Patrick Simmons may also refer to:

Patrick Simmons (politician), Grenadian politician
Pat Simmons (baseball) (Patrick Clement Simmons, 1908–1968), relief pitcher in Major League Baseball

See also
Pat Simmons (disambiguation)